Ashley Nicole Sessa (born 23 June 2004) is a U.S. Women's National Field Hockey Team indoor and field hockey player from the United States, who plays as a midfielder and forward.

Personal life
Ashley Sessa was born and raised in Schwenksville, Pennsylvania. Sessa has been playing field hockey since the age of four.  She attend Spring-Ford High School in Royersford, PA her freshman year, then transferred to Episcopal Academy in Newtown Square, PA where she graduated in 2022. Sessa is currently attending the University of North Carolina in Chapel Hill, NC.

Sessa is a current member of the U.S. Women's National Field Hockey Team where she was one of only three players to be selected in the U.S. Women's National Field Hockey Team at age 16 in 2021; the first was Katie Bam, selected in 2005 and the second was Erin Matson, selected in 2017. She is also a current member of the U.S. Women's National Indoor Field Hockey Team where she was selected at age 14 and the U.S. U-21Junior National Field Hockey Team.

Career

U.S. Women's National Field Hockey Teams 
Ashley Sessa was named to the U.S. Women's National Field Hockey Team in June 2021, her first cap was recorded on November 26, 2021 against Canada in the Canadian Test Series in Chula Vista, California. Sessa's second National Team appearance she placed 4th in the 2022 Pan American Cup in Santiago, Chile. 

In 2019, Sessa made her first appearance for the U.S. Women's National Indoor Field Hockey Team, during a test series against Croatia in Sveti Ivan Zelina. She then went on to represent the U.S. at the Indoor Croatia Cup, in Sveti Ivan Zelina, Croatia, where she won a gold medal. In 2020, Sessa made her second international appearnce with the U.S. Indoor Field Hockey Team at the Rohrmax Cup in Vienna, Austria winning a bronze medal. She won her second gold medal in her third debut with the U.S. Indoor team in 2021, at the Indoor Pan American Cup in Spring City, Pennsylvania where she was also named Player of the Tournament and to the Pan American Elite Team.

Junior National Field Hockey Team
Ashley Sessa made her debut for the U.S. U-21 Junior National Field Hockey Team team in 2021, winning a bronze medal at the Junior Pan American Championship in Santiago, Chile. Sessa also was a member of the U.S. U-21 Junior National Field Hockey Team which placed 8th in the 2021 Junior World Cup in Potchefstroom, South Africa.

World Championship Experience

 Gold medal - 2021 Indoor Pan American Cup (Spring City, Pennsylvania.), Most Valuable Female Player of the Tournament Award
 Bronze medal - 2021 Junior Pan American Championship (Santiago, Chile)
 4th - 2022 Pan American Cup (Santiago, Chile)
 8th - 2021 Junior World Cup (Potchefstroom, South Africa)
 9th - 2021-22 FIH Pro League (worldwide)

Other Career Highlights

 2022: Named to the U.S. Women's National Team 
 2021: Named to the U.S. Women's National Team, Series against Canada (Chula Vista, California), Recorded first cap on November 26 against Canada
 2021: Named to the U.S. National Indoor Team, Named 2021 Indoor Pan American Cup Most Valuable Player of the Tournament
 2021: Named to 2021 Pan American Indoor Elite Team
 2021: Named to U.S. Rise Women's National Team 
 2020: Named to the U.S. U-17 Women's National Team, Series against Canada (Chula Vista, California)
 2020: Named to the U.S. Women's National Indoor Team, Rohrmax Cup (Vienna, Austria)
 2019: Named to the U.S. Women's National Indoor Team,  Croatia Cup (Sveti Ivan Zelina, Croatia)
 2019: Named to the U.S. U-17 Women's National Team, Germany Tour
 2018: Named to the U.S. Women's National Development Indoor Team
 2018: Named to the U.S. U-17 Women's National Team
 2017: Named to the U.S. U-17 Women's National Indoor Team

Club Hockey
Ashley Sessa started playing club fieldhockey at the age of 8 for the WC Eagles Hockey Club (2014 - 2022). She was an eight-time National and Regional Club Champion and ten-time National Indoor Tournament Champion. Sessa was member of the WC Eagles International Travel Squad where she won a gold medal at the 2019 Holland Elite Cup in HC Den Bosch, Netherlands. She won a second gold medal and top scorer award at the 2018 Repton Cup in Repton, England and participated in the China International Series in Spring City, Pennsylvania.

References

External links

2004 births
Living people
American female field hockey players
Female field hockey midfielders
Female field hockey forwards
People from Montgomery County, Pennsylvania
21st-century American women